Paula Francis (born March 12, 1952) is an American journalist.

Life 
Francis was born in Queens, New York City, New York. Paula's TV news career started in Madison, Wisconsin and later moved to Las Vegas in 1985 where she started at KTNV-TV as the evening anchor until she joined KLAS-TV in 1990 as the evening anchor alongside Gary Waddell. Paula has won eight Las Vegas Review-Journal  Best of Las Vegas awards and several humanitarian awards for her involvement in the community.

She has appeared in over a dozen episodes as herself as the news anchor in CSI: Crime Scene Investigation.

Francis retired from anchoring on April 1, 2016.

References

Further reading
 
 

1952 births
Living people
American television reporters and correspondents
Journalists from New York (state)
Journalists from Las Vegas
Journalists from Wisconsin
Television anchors from Las Vegas
University of Wisconsin–Madison alumni
American women television journalists
21st-century American women